The Race of France was the second round of the 2005 World Touring Car Championship season. It was held at the Circuit de Nevers Magny-Cours at Magny-Cours in France on May 1, 2005. Jörg Müller won both races, the first from pole, and the second from eighth on the reversed grid.

Report

Qualifying
Jörg Müller took his first pole position of the season by topping the timesheets in the qualifying session with a time of 1:49.846 in his BMW. Rickard Rydell's SEAT qualified second with a time 0.3 seconds slower than Jörg. Young Brazilian Augusto Farfus was third on the grid in the first Alfa Romeo ahead of reigning world champion Andy Priaulx in his BMW and Gabriele Tarquini in another Alfa Romeo.

Race 1
Jörg Müller raced into the lead from pole, and Andy Priaulx was able to jump into second demoting front-row starter Rickard Rydell down to third. Augusto Farfus, who started third had a poor start and dropped down to sixth. Jörg Müller took a god lead from Priaulx, who also had a good gap to third-placed Rydell, who had to worry about Gabriele Tarquini who was only a second behind. Antonio García battled for fifth with Augusto Farfus until Jordi Gené's SEAT overtook the Brazilian. Farfus lost momentum, allowing Dirk Müller also through, and the latter also proceeded to pass Gené, and this battle allowed García to get a comfortable gap. Jörg Müller won very comfortably, nearly three seconds ahead of Priaulx. Rydell completed the podium ahead of Tarquini, who despite staying close was unable to attack the SEAT car. García, Dirk Müller, Gené and Farfus completed the points, with the Brazilian starting on pole in the next race. Marc Hennerici won the Independent's Trophy with a 13th-place finish.

Race 2
The reverse grid saw Farfus on pole, and he converted it into an early race lead, but however Gené who had started second was swamped by the BMW's and Tarquini's Alfa. At the end on lap 1, Farfus led from Dirk Müller, García, Tarquini, Jörg Müller, Gené, Priaulx who had not gained any spots from 7th, and James Thompson in another factory Alfa. Farfus continued to lead but Jörg Müller was starting to fight his way up, passing Tarquini on lap 2 and García a lap later. The pressure from Dirk Müller to Farfus increased lap after lap, and Farfus made a mistake dropping him from the lead to fifth. Jörg Müller then passed teammate Dirk to take the lead and then pulled away at a rate of knots. Dirk ran second, with García close behind, but Tarquini dropped away. Soon Farfus and Priaulx were past, and the reigning champion then passed Farfus as well to make it a BMW 1-2-3-4. He was not finished yet, and after closing up on Dirk Müller and García, took third from the Spaniard and then attacked Dirk. Well ahead of them now, Jörg Müller won again to make it a double with Dirk holding off Priaulx and García to finish second, as BMW finished 1-2-3-4. Farfus had to settle to fifth, and Gené took sixth from a fading Tarquini, who was also passed by countryman and Alfa teammate Fabrizio Giovanardi near the end. Tom Coronel won the Independent's Trophy after finishing 14th, but he was disqualified for his car not complying with ride height regulations, and the Independent's Trophy went to Carl Rosenblad.

Classification

Race 1

Race 2 

 Note: Tom Coronel was disqualified from 14th as his car failed to comply with the ride height. No driver was given 14th.

Standings after the races

Drivers' Championship standings

Manufacturers' Championship standings

 Note: Only the top five positions are included for the drivers standings.

References

External links

France
Race
FIA WTCC Race of France